Patrick Tang (born 6 May 1974) is a Hong Kong singer, actor, and TV show host who has been involved in numerous drama and movie productions. He has three sisters. He started his career with TVB, where he has been from 2000 to the present day.

Filmography

Television

Film

External links
 Official Blog of Patrick Tang
 Patrick Tang on Sina Weibo
 
 

1974 births
Hong Kong male television actors
Hong Kong male singers
TVB veteran actors
Living people
New Talent Singing Awards contestants
20th-century Hong Kong male actors
Hong Kong male film actors
21st-century Hong Kong male actors